Alipurduar College (now known as 'Alipurduar University'), a co-education college established in 1957 with financial assistance from the Government of India, it got the initial recognition as a Government Sponsored College affiliated to the University of North Bengal under the Refugee Rehabilitation and Development Programme of the Union Government and in due course of time, came under the 2F and 12B category of the University Grants Commission.

About
In the pre-independence period the Sub-Himalayan Dooars region was mainly an area of Tea-gardens and Forest inhabited by people mainly belonging to Scheduled Tribes and Scheduled castes. The partition of the country in 1947 led to the migration of a huge number of displaced people to the Dooars areas. In 1956 under the Refugee Rehabilitation and Development Programme of the Union Government, a local committee led by Late N.K. Mukherjee moved the State Govt. and the Central Government through P.K. Mukherjee, MLA, D.N. Brahma Mandal, MLA, and Biren Katham to establish one undergraduate Degree College at Alipurduar Town. The Union Home Minister G.B. Panth urged the Chief Minister of West Bengal Dr. B.C. Roy for setting up centrally sponsored Degree College at Alipurduar. The State Govt. accorded sanction to establish the present Alipurduar College in early 1957 under the affiliation of Calcutta University. The first Principal Late B.N. Lahiri joined the new College on 01/08/1957. The college was formally inaugurated as Govt. Sponsored College on 21-08-1957 by M.M. Kushari, the D.C. of Jalpaiguri, at the Student's Hostel of McWilliam High School which is now Alipurduar Collegiate School. About 64.48 Acres of land was Donated by the Mc. William School Authority for this college. With 201 Students, four Teachers (including the Principal) one clerk and two class IV staff the college started functioning. Advocate H.P. Mitra was the First Secretary of the College Governing body. The Education Secretary and D.P.I. Dr. D.M. Sen laid the foundation stone of the present College Building on 03/01/1958.

In 1957, the college introduced 1st year Intermediate Arts and Intermediate Science (IA and ISc) Classes in 1957 and 1st year B.A Classes in 1958. Meanwhile, B.N. Lahiri left the college and S.C. Kar joined the college as Principal on 12/04/1961. 1st year B.Sc. Classes began from 1961 to 1962 session. In 1963 the college came under the affiliation of University of North Bengal. The B.Com. Classes started in the Evening Commerce Section from 1963 to 1964. The Commerce Stream merged with the day section of the college in 1978, as a Government Sponsored one.

Both the Boys Hostel and Girls’ Hostel of the college were established in 1962. NCC Boys unit was introduced in 1958, Girls’ unit in 1963 and NSS unit was introduced in 1975. Two separate hostels for S.C. / S.T. Boys and Girls have been set up by the Govt. on the land donated by the college. A new Girls’ Hostel under UGC Special Scheme is under construction.

Departments

Science
Chemistry, Computer Science, Physics, Mathematics, Botany, Zoology, Environmental Studies

Arts and Commerce
Bengali, English, Sanskrit, History, Geography, Political Science, Philosophy, Physical Education, Economics, Commerce, Accountancy, Financial Accounting, Business Studies, Assamese.

Facilities

College Library: The college possesses a well equipped library with plenty of text and reference books and reading room for the use of the students. On completion of admission, the students are to produce their fee receipt to the Librarian for delivery of their cards. Books from the Library can be obtained for home lending only on production of library cards. Delay in returning or loss or damage of library books by a students will incur penalty of fine as per rule.

Full free and Half free: A good number of half and full free studentships are awarded to students on the basis of academic results and financial conditions. No full free or half free studentship will be awarded to a student who enjoy SC/ST stipend or any other student scholarships, as per government rules.

Government Scholarship: Students belonging to Scheduled Castes and Scheduled Tribes are required to apply through the Principal for Stipends and Scholarships.

Student's aid fund: The amount received as contribution from the students to the students’ aid fund disbursed as financial help to the poor and meritorious and BPL students at the time of filling up of the university forms.

College Hostel: The college has two general Hostels, one for boys with 80 seats and one for girls with 60 seats. A new Women's hostel under U.G.C. special scheme is under construction. Two separate Hostels for S.C./S.T. boys and girls have been set up by the Govt. on the college land within the college campus. These two hostels also provide seats to the bona fide S.C./S.T. college students and are controlled by BCW Deptt. of the Govt. of West Bengal. For admission to the college hostels, the students are required to apply in prescribed forms separately after admission to the degree course on payment of necessary fees.

Railway Concessions: Students may obtain concession for railway journey to long-distance places if they apply through the Principal on grounds permissible in terms of the Indian Railways.

National Cadet Corps (NCC): All students, both boys & girls, are allowed to opt for enrolment in NCC, if selected by the concerned NCC officers.

National service scheme (NSS): Eligible students are allowed to get enlisted as NSS volunteers under NSS Programme office of the college for doing Social Works.

Coaching Centre for Entry in Services (CCES): A Coaching Centre for Entry in Services for SC/ST/OBC has been introduced under UGC scheme. The scheme is open free of cost only for SC/ST/OBC students who passed out from this college.

Accreditation

The college is recognized by the University Grants Commission (UGC).

See also

References

External links
Alipurduar College
About- All Details-Alipurduar College
Facebook Page of Alipurduar College
University of North Bengal
University Grants Commission
National Assessment and Accreditation Council

Colleges affiliated to University of North Bengal
Educational institutions established in 1957
Universities and colleges in Alipurduar district
1957 establishments in West Bengal